Kampung Doras is a settlement in the Kuching division of Sarawak, Malaysia.

Neighbouring settlements include:

References

Doras